The Schrambach Formation is a geologic formation in the Northern Limestone Alps of Austria and Germany. It preserves fossils dating back to the Early Cretaceous period.

See also 
 List of fossiliferous stratigraphic units in Austria
 List of fossiliferous stratigraphic units in Germany

References

Further reading 
 A. Lukeneder and D. Rehakova. 2004. Lower Cretaceous Section of the Ternberg Nappe (Northern Calcareous Alps, Upper Austria): facies-changes, biostratigraphy and paleoecology. Geologica Carpathica 55(3):227-237
 A. Lukeneder. 2003. The Karsteniceras level: Dysoxic ammonoid beds within the Early Cretaceous (Barremian, Northern Calcareous Alps, Austria). Facies 49(1):87-100
 A. Lukeneder and K. Tanabe. 2002. In situ finds of aptychi in the Barremian of the Alpine Lower Cretaceous (Northern Calcareous Alps, Upper Austria). Cretaceous Research 23:15-24
 T. Steiger. 1992. Systematik, Stratigraphie und Palökologie der Radiolarien des Oberjura-Unterkreide-Grenzbereiches im Osterhorn-Tirolikum (Nördliche Kalkalpen, Salzburg und Bayern). Zitteliana 19:1-188

External links 
 

Geologic formations of Austria
Geologic formations of Germany
Lower Cretaceous Series of Europe
Cretaceous Austria
Cretaceous Germany
Berriasian Stage
Valanginian Stage
Hauterivian Stage
Barremian Stage
Limestone formations
Marl formations
Deep marine deposits
Open marine deposits
Paleontology in Austria
Paleontology in Germany
Geology of the Alps
Northern Limestone Alps